House of Wax is a 2005 slasher film directed by Jaume Collet-Serra, in his feature directorial debut, and written by Chad Hayes and Carey W. Hayes. The film stars Elisha Cuthbert, Chad Michael Murray, Brian Van Holt in a dual role, Paris Hilton, Jared Padalecki, Jon Abrahams, and Robert Ri'chard. It is a loose remake of the 1953 film of the same name, itself a remake of the 1933 film Mystery of the Wax Museum, based on the story "The Wax Works" by Charles S. Belden. The film soundtrack features music by Deftones, My Chemical Romance, and Interpol.

House of Wax premiered at the Tribeca Film Festival and was released in United States theaters on May 6, 2005, by Warner Bros. Pictures. The film grossed over $70 million worldwide and received mixed or average reviews from critics, who criticized its lack of originality, screenplay, and characters, but praised the performances and atmosphere.

Plot 
On their way to a football game, Carly, her boyfriend Wade, her brother Nick, and their friends, Paige, Dalton and Blake, set up camp for the night in a wooded area. A stranger in a pickup truck arrives, then leaves after Nick smashes one of his headlights. The next morning, Wade discovers his car's fan belt is broken; a local man named Lester offers to drive Wade and Carly to the nearby town of Ambrose while the rest of the group head to the game.

In Ambrose, Carly and Wade meet a man named Bo who offers to sell them a fan belt and drive them back to their car after he is finished attending a funeral. They visit "Trudy's House of Wax" while they wait, a wax museum which is the central feature of the ghost town. They eventually follow Bo back to his house to get the fan belt; Carly waits in his truck while Wade goes inside to use the bathroom. Wade is attacked and knocked unconscious by Bo's twin brother Vincent, who wears a wax mask to cover the facial disfigurement he has from where they were once conjoined. When Carly notice's Bo's truck has a broken headlight, she flees from the scene, chased by Bo who catches her and takes her down to the gas station cellar. Meanwhile, Vincent covers Wade's body in molten wax.

Realising they will not arrive at the game in time, Paige and Blake return to the campsite while Nick and Dalton arrive in Ambrose to look for Carly and Wade. When Carly attempts to call for help, Bo cuts off her fingertip. She manages to get Nick's attention who fends off Bo and then frees Carly, while Dalton finds Wade as part of the museum, trapped in a wax coating. Dalton tries to peel the wax from Wade's face, inadvertently removing his skin in the process. Vincent then ambushes Dalton as he slashes off a section of Wade's face, causing him to die from shock, before decapitating Dalton. 

While searching the town for help, Carly and Nick realise all of the wax figures are actually the wax-coated corpses of visitors. Meanwhile, back at the campsite, Vincent kills Blake and chases Paige into an abandoned sugar mill, where he kills her with a metal pipe through her forehead. Bo and Vincent chase Carly and Nick into the House of Wax. Nick unintentionally starts a fire in the workshop, causing the building and the figures inside to start melting. Bo and Nick battle and Nick is stabbed in the leg before Carly beats Bo to death with a baseball bat. Vincent chases Carly to the top floor where she tries to reason with him over his brother's treachery and, with Nick's help, is then able to stab him in the back. A dead Vincent falls through the floor and lands on top of Bo's corpse while Carly and Nick escape as the building melts to the ground.

The next morning, the police arrive and report that Ambrose had been abandoned for ten years since the sugar mill shut down. As Nick and Carly are driven away by ambulance, they are waved goodbye by Lester, who is revealed to be Bo and Vincent's other brother.

Cast 

 Elisha Cuthbert as Carly
 Chad Michael Murray as Nick
 Brian Van Holt as Bo and Vincent Sinclair
 Damon Herriman as Lester Sinclair
 Paris Hilton as Paige
 Jared Padalecki as Wade
 Jon Abrahams as Dalton
 Robert Ri'chard as Blake

Filming 
House of Wax was filmed at Warner Bros. Movie World, Australia. The Town set was constructed a few miles down the road, off Hollindale Road, in the Guanaba area.

Lawsuit 
In January 2006, Village Roadshow Studios owners Village Theme Park Management and Warner Brothers Movie World Australia announced they were suing special effects expert David Fletcher and Wax Productions because of a fire on the set during production.

The $7 million lawsuit alleges that Mr. Fletcher and Wax Productions were grossly negligent over the fire, which destroyed part of the Gold Coast's Warner Bros. Movie World studios. The alleged grounds of negligence included not having firefighters on stand-by and using timber props near a naked flame. The set where the fire broke out has now been demolished and is a field kept for Movie World for future projects.

Release 
Opening in 3,111 theaters, the film grossed $12 million in its opening weekend. House of Wax earned $70 million worldwide, $32 million of which came from North American receipts. House of Wax also earned $42 million in VHS/DVD rentals. A marketing campaign was launched to promote the film entitled  "See Paris Die", to capitalize on the appearance of Paris Hilton in the film, as her casting had been met with disapproval by some horror fans. The campaign promised that viewers would "See Paris Die" in the film in a gruesome fashion and Hilton created shirts featuring the slogan.

On July 13, 2021 a collector's edition Blu-Ray of House of Wax was released by Scream Factory in the US & Canada.

Reception 
On Rotten Tomatoes the film has an approval rating of 27% based on 160 reviews and the average rating is 4.29/10.  The site's consensus reads, "Bearing little resemblance to the 1953 original, House of Wax is a formulaic but better-than-average teen slasher flick." On Metacritic, which uses an average of critics' reviews, the film has a weighted average score of 41 out of 100 based on 36 critics, indicating "mixed or average reviews". Audiences polled by CinemaScore gave the film an average grade of "C+" on an A+ to F scale.

Chicago Sun-Times film critic Roger Ebert gave the film two out of four stars and wrote, "House of Wax is not a good movie, but it is an efficient one and will deliver most of what anyone attending House of Wax could reasonably expect...assuming it would be unreasonable to expect very much." He said of Hilton's performance that "she is no better or worse than the typical Dead Post-Teenager and does exactly what she is required to do in a movie like this, with all the skill—admittedly finite—that is required."  Film critic Stephen Hunter of The Washington Post, gave the film four out of five stars, calling it a "guilty pleasure" and wrote that it gives horror fans exactly what they want. Mick LaSalle of the San Francisco Chronicle rated it 4/5 stars and wrote, "After a month, no one will talk about this movie again. Still, with a picture like this, there is really only one question: Is it fun? Yes. Lots. Definitely." Bruce Westbrook of the Houston Chronicle called it boring and poorly-acted, though he complimented Cuthbert and Murray.  A. O. Scott of The New York Times wrote, "The set design is fairly elaborate by the standards of the genre, and the victims don't die in precisely the order you might expect, but everything else goes pretty much according to formula".

Awards and nominations

Soundtrack 

House of Wax: Music from the Motion Picture is the soundtrack for House of Wax, consisting of commercially recorded songs. A second album was released containing the film score composed by John Ottman, and was simply titled House of Wax.

One song from the film does not appear on the soundtrack: "Roland" by Interpol appears in the scene at the beginning of the film when the group decides to camp overnight. The song that plays during the end credits is "Helena" by My Chemical Romance.

See also 
 2005 in film
 Mystery of the Wax Museum
 Terror in the Wax Museum
 Waxwork

References

External links 
 
 
 
 
 
 
 
 

2005 films
2005 horror films
2000s serial killer films
2000s slasher films
2000s teen horror films
Remakes of American films
American serial killer films
American slasher films
American teen horror films
Australian slasher films
Australian teen films
Dark Castle Entertainment films
2005 directorial debut films
Films directed by Jaume Collet-Serra
Films produced by Joel Silver
Films scored by John Ottman
Films about orphans
Films about dysfunctional families
Films about brothers
Films set in 1974
Films set in 2005
Films set in ghost towns
Films set in museums
Films shot in Australia
Golden Raspberry Award winning films
Horror film remakes
Mannequins in films
Village Roadshow Pictures films
Warner Bros. films
2000s English-language films
Films produced by Robert Zemeckis
2000s American films